The 2006 ICC World Cricket League Africa Region Division Two was a cricket tournament in Tanzania, taking place between 23 April and 27 August 2006. It gave five African Associate and Affiliate members of the International Cricket Council experience of international one-day cricket and formed part of the global World Cricket League structure.

The top team, Tanzania, was promoted to Division 1.

Teams

There were 5 teams that played in the tournament. These teams were non-test member nations of the African Cricket Association. The teams that played were:

Squads

Group stage

Points Table

Group stage

Statistics

International cricket competitions in 2006
2006, 2
International cricket competitions in Tanzania
2006 in Tanzanian sport